Edin Mujčin (born 14 January 1970) is a Bosnian retired footballer.

Mujčin moved to Croatia during the Bosnian War. He holds the Croatian citizenship.

Club career
Mujčin spent most of his career with Croatian team Dinamo Zagreb, winning several national titles and appearing in both UEFA Champions League and UEFA Cup. He spent his last two seasons at NK Kamen Ingrad in the Croatian first division, before retiring from professional football following their relegation in 2007.

Club statistics

International career
He made his debut for Bosnia and Herzegovina in a June 1997 World Cup qualification match away against Denmark and has earned a total of 24 caps, scoring 1 goal. His final international was an October 2002 European Championship qualification match away against Norway.

National team statistics

International goals 
Scores and results list Bosnia and Herzegovina's goal tally first.

References

External links

1970 births
Living people
People from Brod, Bosnia and Herzegovina
Bosniaks of Croatia
Association football midfielders
Yugoslav footballers
Bosnia and Herzegovina footballers
Bosnia and Herzegovina international footballers
NK Marsonia players
GNK Dinamo Zagreb players
JEF United Chiba players
NK Kamen Ingrad players
NK Lokomotiva Zagreb players
NK Lučko players
NK Zelina players
Croatian Football League players
J1 League players
Second Football League (Croatia) players
Bosnia and Herzegovina expatriate footballers
Expatriate footballers in Croatia
Bosnia and Herzegovina expatriate sportspeople in Croatia
Expatriate footballers in Japan
Bosnia and Herzegovina expatriate sportspeople in Japan